NBC 17 may refer to one of the following television stations in the United States:

Current
KGET-TV in Bakersfield, California
KMOL-LD in Victoria, Texas
WAND in Decatur/Springfield/Champaign/Urbana, Illinois

Former
KCBJ-TV (now KMIZ) in Columbia/Jefferson City, Missouri (1982 to 1985)
WBUF-TV in Buffalo, New York (was owned-and-operated by NBC from 1955 to 1958)
WJKS (now WCWJ) in Jacksonville, Florida (1980 to 1988)
WNCN in Raleigh/Durham, North Carolina (1995 to 2016; was owned-and-operated by NBC until 2006)
WTVO in Rockford, Illinois (1953 to 1995)